Vicar of Bray may refer to:

 "The Vicar of Bray" (song), an 18th-century satirical song about a quasi-fictional clergyman, to which all other uses refer
The Vicar of Bray, a satirical description of an individual fundamentally changing his principles to remain in ecclesiastical office as external requirements change around him
Simon Aleyn, probably the original of the song, as Vicar of Bray, Berkshire, until he died in 1565
The Vicar of Bray (opera), a comic opera by Edward Solomon with a libretto by Sydney Grundy first performed in 1882
The Vicar of Bray (film), a 1937 film set in Bray, County Wicklow, Ireland
Vicar of Bray (scientific hypothesis), an evolutionary hypothesis
 The Church of England vicar of St Michael's Church, Bray in Berkshire, England

See also  
George Orwell's essay A Good Word for the Vicar of Bray